The 1912–13 Danish National Football Tournament was the first Danish championship under the Danish Football Association.

Format 
The five provincial unions (covering Bornholm, Funen, Jutland, Lolland-Falster and Zealand) each had separate tournaments. The winners of these entered the provincial tournament for a place in the final against the winner of the Copenhagen Championship for the first Danish football championship.

Province tournament

First round

Second round

Third round

Copenhagen Championship

Final

External links
Denmark - List of final tables (RSSSF)
Landsfodboldturneringen 1912/13 at danskfodbold.com

1912–13 in Danish football
Top level Danish football league seasons
Denmark